Florin Huidu (born 24 April 1976) is a Romanian sprint canoer who competed from the mid-1990s to the early 2000s (decade). At the 1996 Summer Olympics in Atlanta, he was eliminated in the semifinals of the C-1 500 m event. Four years later in Sydney, Huidu was eliminated in the semifinals of both the C-1 500 m and the C-1 1000 m event.

References

1976 births
Canoeists at the 1996 Summer Olympics
Canoeists at the 2000 Summer Olympics
Living people
Olympic canoeists of Romania
Romanian male canoeists